The Juno Awards of 1996, representing Canadian music industry achievements of the previous year, were awarded on 10 March 1996 in Hamilton, Ontario at a ceremony in the Copps Coliseum. Anne Murray was the host for the ceremonies, which were broadcast on CBC Television.

Quebec-based independent classical label Analekta Records boycotted the Junos after failing to receive a Juno nomination after attempts for five years. Analekta claimed its sales were twice that of CBC Records.

Several record stores such as CD Plus, HMV, Sunrise and Music World also intended to boycott the Junos because competing music retailer Columbia House had signed on as a Juno advertiser.

Nominations were announced 31 January 1996. Prominent nominees were Alanis Morissette and Shania Twain who had recent internationally successful albums who both won Grammy Awards on 28 February 1996. Alanis Morissette won in five Juno categories, becoming this year's major winner.

Nominees and winners

Levi's Entertainer of the Year
Presented by David Clayton-Thomas, Denny Doherty, John Kay, Domenic Troiano and Zal Yanovsky, this award was chosen by a national poll rather than by Juno organisers CARAS.

Winner: Shania Twain

Other Nominees:
 Bryan Adams
 Jann Arden
 Alanis Morissette
 The Tragically Hip

Best Female Vocalist
Presented by Russell DeCarle and Buffy Sainte-Marie.

Winner: Alanis Morissette

Other Nominees:
 Susan Aglukark
 Celine Dion
 Rita MacNeil
 Shania Twain

Best Male Vocalist
Presented by Susan Aglukark and Kim Mitchell.

Winner: Colin James

Other Nominees:
 Tom Cochrane
 Charlie Major
 Mario Pelchat
 Neil Young

Best New Solo Artist
Winner: Ashley MacIsaac

Other Nominees:
 Lara Fabian
 Amanda Marshall
 Laura Smith
 Kim Stockwood

Group of the Year
This award was presented by Canadian Music Hall of Fame inductees The Diamonds and The Crew Cuts

Winner: Blue Rodeo

Other Nominees:
 The Headstones
 Odds
 The Rankin Family
 The Tea Party

Best New Group
Winner: Philosopher Kings

Other Nominees:
 Hemingway Corner
 Rainbow Butt Monkeys
 Rymes with Orange
 Sandbox

Songwriter of the Year
Winner: Alanis Morissette

Other Nominees:
 Bryan Adams
 Anne Loree
 Odds
 Shania Twain

Best Country Female Vocalist
Presented by George Fox and Charlie Major, this award was accepted on Twain's behalf by her sister Carrie-Anne because she was too sick to attend.

Winner: Shania Twain

Other Nominees:
 Lisa Brokop
 Cindy Church
 Patricia Conroy
 Michelle Wright

Best Country Male Vocalist
Winner: Charlie Major

Other Nominees:
 George Fox
 Jason McCoy
 Don Neilson
 Calvin Wiggett

Best Country Group or Duo
Winner: Prairie Oyster

Other Nominees:
 Farmer's Daughter
 Quartette
 The Johner Brothers
 The Rankin Family

Best Instrumental Artist
Winner: Liona Boyd

Other Nominees:
 Richard Abel
 George Amatino
 Hennie Bekker
 André Gagnon

Best Producer
Winner: Michael Phillip Wojewoda, "End of the World" by The Waltons; "Beaton's Delight" by Ashley MacIsaac

Other Nominees:
 Bryan Adams with co-producer Robert John "Mutt" Lange, "Have You Ever Really Loved a Woman" by Bryan Adams
 David Foster (with co-producer Madonna), "You'll See (Something to Remember)" by Madonna; "I Can Love You Like That (And the Music Speaks)" by All-4-One
 Chad Irschick, "O Siem" by Susan Aglukark
 David Tyson, "Beautiful Goodbye" and "Birmingham" by Amanda Marshall

Best Recording Engineer
Winner: Chad Irschick, "O Siem" by Susan Aglukark

Other Nominees:
 Lenny DeRose, "Faith" and "Their Lights" by Crash Vegas
 Kevin Doyle, "Here, There and Everywhere" by John McDermott
 Rob Heany, "Alegria" by Cirque du Soleil
 Ian Terry, "The Way You Look Tonight" by Oliver Jones and "Canon" by D.D. Jackson

Canadian Music Hall of Fame
Winners: David Clayton-Thomas, Denny Doherty, John Kay, Domenic Troiano, Zal Yanovsky

Walt Grealis Special Achievement Award
Winner: Ronnie Hawkins

Nominated and winning albums

Best Album
Presented by Deborah Cox and Robbie Robertson.

Winner: Jagged Little Pill, Alanis Morissette

Other Nominees:
 D'eux, Celine Dion
 Ragged Ass Road, Tom Cochrane
 The Woman in Me, Shania Twain
 This Child, Susan Aglukark

Best Children's Album
Winner: Celery Stalks At Midnight, Al Simmons

Other Nominees:
 Hallelujah Handel!, Susan Hammond, Classical Kids
 The Keeper, Will Millar
 Philharmonic Fool, Rick Scott
 Raffi Radio, Raffi

Best Classical Album (Solo or Chamber Ensemble)
Winner: Alkan: Grande Sonate/Sonatine/ Le Festin d'Esope, piano Marc-Andre Hamelin

Other Nominees:
 Bach: Violin Concertos, Jeanne Lamon, Tafelmusik
 Debussy: Preludes, Livres 1 and 2, piano Francine Kay
 Quartet for the End of Time, Amici Ensemble with violin Shmuel Askenasi
 Suite hébraïque, violin Jacques Israelievitch, piano John Greer

Best Classical Album (Large Ensemble)
Winner: Shostakovich: Symphonies 5 & 9, Orchestre symphonique de Montreal, conductor Charles Dutoit

Other Nominees:
 Debussy: Children's Corner, Orchestre symphonique de Montreal
 Mendelssohn: Symphonies 1 and 5, Hebrides Overture, Calgary Philharmonic Orchestra
 Purcell: Ayres for the Theatre, Tafelmusik
 Tchaikovsky and Sibelius: Violin Concertos, Leila Josefowicz, The Academy of St. Martin in the Fields

Best Classical Album (Vocal or Choral Performance)
Winner: Ben Heppner Sings Richard Strauss, tenor Ben Heppner, The Toronto Symphony Orchestra, conductor Andrew Davis

Other Nominees:
 Great Tenor Arias, Ben Heppner, Munich Radio Orchestra
 Healey Willan: An Apostrophe to the Heavenly Hosts, Vancouver Chamber Choir
 J.S. Bach: Secular Cantatas, Vol. 1, Dorothea Röschmann, Hugues Saint-Gelais, Kevin McMillan, Les Violons du Roy
 Ravel: L'enfant et les sortileges, Sheherazade, Orchestre symphonique de Montreal and Choir

Best Album Design
Winner: Tom Wilson and Alex Wittholz, Birthday Boy

Other Nominees:
 David Andoff, Derek Shapton, Hi, How Are You Today? by Ashley MacIsaac
 David Andoff, Paul van Dongen, Tara McVicar, Bootsauce by Bootsauce
 Steven R. Gilmore, Anthony Artiaga, Good Weird Feeling, Odds
 Kathi Prosser, Peter Horvath, Dragonfly by Mae Moore

Best Selling Album (Foreign or Domestic)
Winner: No Need to Argue, The Cranberries

Other Nominees:
 D'eux, Celine Dion
 Dangerous Minds
 Hell Freezes Over, Eagles
 The Woman in Me, Shania Twain

Best Blues/Gospel Album
Winner: That River, Jim Byrnes

Other Nominees:
 Big City Blues, Sue Foley
 Rites of Passage, Georgette Fry
 Urban Blues re: Newell, King Biscuit Boy
 When the Sun Goes Down, The Sidemen

Best Mainstream Jazz Album
Winner: Vernal Fields, Ingrid Jensen

Other Nominees:
 A Timeless Place, Jeri Brown
 Basso Continuo, Normand Guilbeault Ensemble
 From Lush to Lively, Oliver Jones
 Peace Song, D.D. Jackson

Best Contemporary Jazz Album
Winner: NOJO, Neufeld-Occhipinti Jazz Orchestra

Other Nominees:
 Frontier Tunes, The Merlin Factor
 Lucky to be Me, Carol Welsman
 Rendez-vous Brazil Cuba, Jane Bunnett
 Touch, Rich Shadrach Lazar and Montuno Police

Best Selling Francophone Album
Winner: D'eux, Celine Dion

Other Nominees:
 Beau dommage, Beau Dommage
 Bohemienne, Marjo
 Carpe diem, Lara Fabian
 C'est la vie, Mario Pelchat

Rock Album of the Year
Presented by Burton Cummings and Alannah Myles.

Winner: Jagged Little Pill, Alanis Morissette

Other Nominees:
 The Edges of Twilight, The Tea Party
 Good Weird Feeling, Odds
 Mirror Ball, Neil Young
 Teeth and Tissue, Headstones

Best Roots or Traditional Album - Group
Winner: Gypsies & Lovers, The Irish Descendants

Other Nominees:
 Inside the Dreaming, The Wyrd Sisters
 Late As Usual, The Paperboys
 Night Visions, Orealis
 Up, Great Big Sea

Best Roots or Traditional Album - Solo
Winner: Ashley MacIsaac, Hi™ How Are You Today?

Other Nominees: 
Susan Crowe, This Far From Home
James Keelaghan, A Recent Future
Danielle Martineau, Autrement
Laura Smith, B'tween the Earth and My Soul

Best Alternative Album
Winner: What Fresh Hell is This?, Art Bergmann

Other Nominees:
 Fluke, Rusty
 Kombinator, The Inbreds
 Mock Up, Scale Down, The Super Friendz
 Somebody Spoke, Hardship Post

Nominated and winning releases

Single of the Year
Winner: "You Oughta Know", Alanis Morissette

Other Nominees:
 "Any Man of Mine", Shania Twain
 "Have You Ever Really Loved a Woman", Bryan Adams
 "Insensitive", Jann Arden
 "O Siem", Susan Aglukark

Best Classical Composition
Winner: Concerto For Violin And Orchestra, Andrew P. MacDonald, David Stewart, Manitoba Chamber Orchestra

Other Nominees:
 "I Think That I Shall Never See...", Chan Ka Nin for Amici
 "Music for Heaven and Earth", Alexina Louie for Esprit Orchestra
 "Piano Concerto", Glenn Buhr for Christina Petrowksa, Winnipeg Symphony Orchestra
 "Touchings", Harry Freedman for Nexus, The Esprit Orchestra

Best Music of Aboriginal Canada Recording
Winner: ETSI Shon "Grandfather Song", Jerry Alfred and the Medicine Beat

Other Nominees:
 Dancing Around the World, Red Bull
 Message, Wapistan
 Sacred Ground, Jess Lee
 This Child, Susan Aglukark

Best Rap Recording
Winner: "E-Z On Tha Motion", Ghetto Concept

Other Nominees:
 "Drama", Da Grassroots with Elemental
 "The Legacy", UBAD
 "Still Caught Up", Saukrates
 "360 Degrees", Cipher

Best R&B/Soul Recording
Presented by Ronnie Hawkins and Colin James.

Winner: Deborah Cox, Deborah Cox

Other Nominees:
 Absolute, jacksoul
 Feel the Good Times, Charlene Smith
 Memories of the SoulShack Survivors, Bass is Base
 Philosopher Kings, Philosopher Kings

Best Reggae Recording
Winner: "Now and Forever", Sattalites

Other Nominees:
 "Real Personal", Tanya Mullings
 "Si Wi Dem Nuh Know We", Snow
 "Something Real", Lazo
 "Waking Up the Dream", Errol Blackwood

Best Global Album
Winner: Music From Africa, Takadja

Other Nominees:
 Alegria, Cirque du Soleil
 Jmpn For Joy, Punjabi by Nature
 Vamo a Pambicha, Papo Ross and Orquesta Pambiche
 When Ahab Met Moishe, The Angstones

Best Dance Recording
Winner: "A Deeper Shade Of Love (Extended Mix)", Camille

Other Nominees:
 "Come Into My Life (Extended Mix)", JLM
 "Get Away (Stonebridge and Nick Nice Club Mix)", Shauna Davis
 "Never Let You Go (Tempered Club Mix)", Temperance
 "Take Control (Matrix Airplay Edit)", BKS

Best Video
Presented by Amanda Marshall and The Odds.

Winner: Jeth Weinrich, "Good Mother" by Jann Arden

Other Nominees:
 Alain DesRochers, "O Siem" by Susan Aglukark
 Tim Hamilton, "The Ballad of Peter Pumpkinhead" by Crash Test Dummies
 Stephen Scott, "Freedom" by Colin James
 Curtis Wehrfritz, "Sister Awake" by The Tea Party

References

External links
Juno Awards site

1996
1996 music awards
1996 in Canadian music
Culture of Hamilton, Ontario